Anastasia Pavlyuchenkova was the defending champion, but withdrew before the tournament began.

Garbiñe Muguruza won the title, defeating Tímea Babos in the final, 3–6, 6–4, 6–3.

Seeds

Draw

Finals

Top half

Bottom half

Qualifying

Seeds

Qualifiers

Draw

First qualifier

Second qualifier

Third qualifier

Fourth qualifier

References
Main Draw
Qualifying Draw

Monterrey Open - Singles
2018 Singles